Statistics of American Soccer League in season 1930.

Overview
In 1928, a dispute broke out between the American Soccer League and the United States Football Association regarding participation in the National Challenge Cup.  The League decided to boycott the cup, but three teams, Bethlehem Steel, the Newark Skeeters and the New York Giants all entered the competition.  When the league suspended the three teams, the USFA offered to bankroll the creation of a new league, the Eastern Professional Soccer League.  This new league included the three ex-American Soccer League teams, four teams from the Southern New York Football Association and one newly created team, New York Hakoah.  By the fall of 1929, the onset of the Great Depression and the competition between the ASL and EPSL had created significant financial problems for both leagues and the USFA.  Consequently, the USFA and the two leagued came to an agreement to end the dispute on October 9, 1929.  The two leagues entered into discussions to merge.  By the first week of November 1929, the merger was complete with the new league taking the name of the Atlantic Coast Soccer League.  The new league decided to run a two-part 1930 season.  Oddly enough, they decided to play the first games of the 1930 season during the weekend of November 6, 1929.  The first half of the season ended the last weekend of April 1930.  During the summer of 1930, the league resumed the name American Soccer League, beginning the second half of the season in September and ending the first weekend of January 1931.  Although the league attempted to continue operations as it had before the dispute with the USFA, it began to fail during the 1930 season.  The dispute between the ASL and USFA financially weakened the league and its teams.  The onset of the Great Depression in 1929 further exacerbated these problems.  This resulted in significant changes in the lineup of teams in the league.

Team turmoil
Boston became the first team to fail, leaving the league and disbanding after only four games.  The second team to fail was one which had just entered the ASL, Bridgeport Hungaria.  Based in Bridgeport, Pennsylvania, the team moved to Newark, New Jersey after ten games, played another five in Newark, then withdrew from the league and disbanded.  During the mid-season break, Bethlehem Steel F.C. withdrew and disbanded.  Then, the New York Giants renamed themselves the New York Soccer Club.  The New York Nationals immediately took the name Giants.

Champions
The Fall River Marksmen finished top of the table in both the first and second half.  The league saw no need for a playoff and declared the Marksmen champions.  The Marksmen also won the league (Lewis) cup and the 1929–30 National Challenge Cup, giving it a treble.  Having achieved this distinction, the Marksmen promptly withdrew from the league and merged with the New York Soccer Club to form the New York Yankees for the 1931 season.

League standings

First half (Atlantic Coast Soccer League)

Second half (American Soccer League)

League Cup
The winners of the League Cup final were awarded the H.E. Lewis Cup. Hakoah All-Stars and New York Nationals were forced to play a replay on May 22, 1930, to determine a winner after the first two matches ended in draws, and neither side scored in 30 minutes of extra time at the end of the second match.

The first game of the two-game final was originally scheduled for May 25, 1930, but was cancelled due to rain.  It took place at night at a neutral site, the Polo Grounds in New York, two days later.  The second game of the final was then scheduled for May 28, but rain forced its cancellation as well.  The game was continually rescheduled until it was finally played on October 23, 1930.

Bracket

Final

First leg

Second leg
Fall River Marksmen won Lewis Cup, 5–1, on aggregate.

Goals leaders

References

External links
The Year in American Soccer - 1929

1930
American